Fink is an unincorporated community in Lewis County, West Virginia, United States. Its post office  is closed.

The community was named after nearby Fink Creek.

References 

Unincorporated communities in West Virginia
Unincorporated communities in Lewis County, West Virginia